Solenopsora is a genus of lichen-forming fungi in the family Catillariaceae. It has 15 species, with a mostly Northern Hemisphere distribution.

Taxonomy
The genus was circumscribed by Italian lichenologist Abramo Bartolommeo Massalongo in 1855, with Solenopsora requienii assigned as the type species. However, this species had previously been described in 1840 by Camille Montagne, as Parmelia holophaea.

Description
Solenopsora lichens produce thalli of various morphologies, including crust-like (crustose), scaley (squamulose), and leafy (foliose). Depending on the species, the apothecia may be immersed on the substrate, emergent on the substrate surface, or somewhat elevated on a stalk (stipitate). A combination of microscopic characteristics define the genus Solenopsora. They all have asci that contain eight spores, and are of the Catillaria-type. This means that they have a prominent, amyloid tholus (the thickened inner part of the tip of an ascus) that lacks any internal differentiation such as an axial body. They have simple (i.e. unbranched) paraphyses with an internal brown pigmentation and club-shaped tips. Their ascospores are colourless and translucent (hyaline), and contain a single septum.

Catillaria is a closely related genus that differs mainly in having a thallus that is always crustose, and apothecia with a proper margin.

Habitat and distribution
Most Solenopsora species are found in the Northern Hemisphere, including Asia, Europe, western North Africa, North America, and the Canary Islands. Three species are known from Australia. Eight species occur in Europe.

Species
, Species Fungorum accepts 15 species of Solenopsora:
Solenopsora candicans 
Solenopsora cesatii 
Solenopsora chihuahuana 
Solenopsora cladonioides 
Solenopsora cyathiformis 
Solenopsora elixiana  – Queensland; La Réunion; Taiwan
Solenopsora grisea 
Solenopsora holophaea 
Solenopsora isidiata 
Solenopsora liparina 
Solenopsora olivacea 
Solenopsora requienii 
Solenopsora sordida  – New Zealand
Solenopsora tasmanica  – Tasmania
Solenopsora vulturiensis  – Western Australia; Europe; Macaronesia

References

Lecanorales
Lecanorales genera
Lichen genera
Taxa described in 1855
Taxa named by Abramo Bartolommeo Massalongo